Isoindenone is a polycyclic ketone with chemical formula C9H6O.  It is a cross-conjugated. It is unstable.

See also 
 Indene
 Indenone
 Isoindene

References

Enones